Thelia is a genus of treehoppers in the family Membracidae. There are at least two described species in Thelia.

Species
These two species belong to the genus Thelia:
 Thelia bimaculata Fabricius c g b (locust treehopper)
 Thelia uhleri Stål c g b
Data sources: i = ITIS, c = Catalogue of Life, g = GBIF, b = Bugguide.net

References

Further reading

External links

 

Smiliinae
Auchenorrhyncha genera